The Shak was an Australian children's television program broadcast on the Nine Network. Its four hosts, Curio (Drew Jarvis), Nitro (Beau Walker), Picasso (Kendal Nagorcka) and Eco (Jacqueline Duncan) answered viewer questions, queries, dares and challenges in an entertaining and educational manner.  Each host's name relates to their personality and the type of stories they present. Viewers sent questions and suggestions to the presenters via the shows website.

Production
The series was filmed, for the main part, at a studio resembling a large shed or shack, hence the name "Shak", it decorated with all manner of objects. The characters arrived via a prop of a wave, and exited through a door on the other side of the shack. They were known as 'Shaksters', as were the viewers. Other filming was done at various attractions and locations on the Gold Coast where the Shak was set, with Dreamworld being a regular filming spot.

In 2006, the filming was done at Sea World but in early 2007, filming was moved to the WhiteWater World theme park. This was explained via an explosion made by Curio, which resulted in the Shaksters moving. and the opening titles were fully animated however in 2007 it was changed to a mix of live action and animation.

Ending 
The show ended in mid-2008 so it could make way for the Sequel The Shak at Home which had Curio, Nitro and Picasso living in a share house. Picasso later left the show and was later replaced by a new character named Willow. The sequel ended on 13 January 2010

Series summaries
Series 1 - Series 1 first aired in 2006 at 4:00pm weekdays, It replaced Hot Source. The opening was entirely cartoon animated and had the whole original cast which included Eco, Curio, Nitro And Picasso. The show was not very popular, but soon gained a steady audience.

Series 2 - Series 2 aired in early 2007. This series had a lot more comedy and entertaining segments with Drew Jarvis showing his talent with his alter egos. This series had an audience boost and was better received by audiences.

Series 3 - Series 3 aired in late 2007. This added the character "Geordie" as Nitros best friend.

Series 4 - Series 4 aired in January–March 2008.

Series 5 - Series 5 was shown in 2008 with a number of guests, Such as Bert Newton as Curio's Grandfather and a number of athletes, dancers and people associated with the themes. All of the cast returned for this series.

Series 6 - Series 6 was shown in November–December 2008.

Series 7 - Series 7 was shown in early 2009 and was the last series of the original format. It was called the best series by audiences. It was the highest rating series at that time. This was Eco's last season.

'Series 8 and beyond - This season changed format into half hour scripted acting where Picasso, Nitro and Curio shared a house together, and the storylines revolved around this. It was a half hour multi cam format.

International airings

Canada
 TVOntario

Papua New Guinea
 EM TV

References

External links
 
 
 The Shak - Episode Guide | LocateTV
 Australian TV Guide - yourTV.com.au

Australian children's education television series
Nine Network original programming
2006 Australian television series debuts
2009 Australian television series endings
Television shows set in Gold Coast, Queensland
English-language television shows